The Lucas County Courthouse is an architecturally-significant courthouse in downtown Toledo, Ohio, located at 700 Adams Street.  The courthouse first opened in 1897. It was designed by David L. Stine.

The courthouse was added to the National Register of Historic Places in 1973.

Offices
Lucas County Common Pleas Court (10 judges)
County Prosecutor's office
Clerk of Courts

Gallery

References

External links

County courthouses in Ohio
Courthouses on the National Register of Historic Places in Ohio
Government buildings completed in 1897
Buildings and structures in Toledo, Ohio
National Register of Historic Places in Lucas County, Ohio
Jails on the National Register of Historic Places in Ohio
Jails in Ohio
1897 establishments in Ohio